Hypsipyle (minor planet designation: 587 Hypsipyle), provisional designation , is a stony Phocaea asteroid from the inner regions of the asteroid belt, approximately 12 kilometers in diameter. It was discovered on 22 February 1906, by Germany astronomer Max Wolf at Heidelberg Observatory in southwest Germany.

The asteroid was named after the Queen Hypsipyle from Greek mythology and is one of the principal members of the Phocaea family.

References

External links 
 Asteroid Lightcurve Database (LCDB), query form (info )
 Dictionary of Minor Planet Names, Google books
 Asteroids and comets rotation curves, CdR – Observatoire de Genève, Raoul Behrend
 Discovery Circumstances: Numbered Minor Planets (1)-(5000) – Minor Planet Center
 
 

000587
Discoveries by Max Wolf
Named minor planets
19060222